The Cornucopia Jailhouse is a former jailhouse located on Second Street in the ghost town of Cornucopia, Oregon. The building was added to the National Register of Historic Places on November 24, 2014.

See also
 National Register of Historic Places listings in Baker County, Oregon

References

External links
 

1885 establishments in Oregon
Government buildings completed in 1885
Jails on the National Register of Historic Places in Oregon
National Register of Historic Places in Baker County, Oregon